Daru of Baekje (?–77, r. 28–77) was the second king of Baekje, one of the Three Kingdoms of Korea.

Background
He was the eldest son of the founding monarch Onjo and became the heir of throne in the year 10. He became king upon Onjo's death in 28 which was the 46th year of his reign. The Samguk Sagi records that "he was a generous man and had presence and esteem".

Reign
The Samguk Sagi records many battles against the "Malgal" during Daru's reign. It is unclear who this refers to, as the Mohe tribes are thought to have occupied Manchuria northwest of the northern Korean kingdom Goguryeo, far from Baekje's capital (generally presumed to have been in the present-day Seoul region). The "Malgal" do not appear to refer to the Buyeo people that founded Baekje, nor to the Mahan confederacy tribes subjugated by Baekje. They appear to have remained from the earlier period, incited by Chinese commanderies to attack Baekje. The battles indicate that Baekje as a new power was still expanding its control of the central Korean Peninsula.

Samguk Sagi:
 29 AD, spring, first month. The king paid respects at the shrine of his grandfather, Jumong. Second month. The king made sacrifices to heaven at the southern altar.
 30 AD, winter, tenth month. Heul-u(屹于) of the eastern district fought the Malgal to the west of Mt. Masu where he overcame them and awarded by the king.
 31 AD, autumn, eighth month. Gon-u(昆優), of the fortress of Gobon fought the Malgal and defeated them beheading over 200. Ninth month. The king went hunting at the summit of Mt. Hoeng(橫) and killed two deer in succession, and the people admired and praised him.
 33 AD, spring, first month. His son Giru is made crown prince. Second month. The king ordered that the southern counties of the country begin to cultivate grain.
 34 AD, spring, second month. The Marshal Bulwark of the Right, Gaeru, died. He was 90 years old. Heulu from the eastern district became Marshal Bulwark of the Right. Summer, fourth month. There was a red mist in the east. Autumn, ninth month. The Malgal attacked and sacked the Masu Fortress burning down houses of the common folk. Winter, tenth month. They attacked the palisade at Mt. Byeong.
 37 AD, winter, tenth month. The Marshal Bulwark of the Right, Heulu, became Marshal Bulwark of the Left. Jinhoe of the northern district became Marshal Bulwark of the Right. eleventh month. There was an earthquake that sounded like thunder.
 38 AD, autumn. The grains did not mature. Private brewing of alcohol was prohibited. Winter, tenth month. The king made a tour to console the two districts of the east and west. The poor people could not support themselves, and they were provided with 200 seok of tax grain.
 48 AD, spring, second month. A great locust tree in the palace grounds rotted on its own. Third month. The Marshal Bulwark of the Left, Heulu, died. The king wept and mourned him.
 55 AD, spring and summer. There was a drought. The king was worried and released prisoners, even those who had committed capital offenses. Autumn, eight month. The Malgal assaulted the northern borders.
 56 AD, spring, second month. The king ordered the people of the eastern district to build Ugok Fortress (우곡성/牛谷城). This was a preparation against the Malgal.
 63 AD, winter, tenth month. The king expanded his domain to Nangjagok Fortress. Then he sent messengers rival Korean state Silla to ask to meet them, but they did not come.
 64 AD, he dispatched soldiers to attack the Wasan Fortress (와산성/蛙山城) in Silla (today's Boeun), but they could not take it. Then he moved the soldiers to attack Goeyang Fortress (today's Okcheon or Goesan). Silla dispatched 2,000 soldiers and cavalry who fought back and repelled [the invaders].
 66 AD, he attacked and captured Silla's Wasan Fortress. 200 men were stationed there to defend it, but Silla won it back.
 70 AD, soldiers were dispatched to attack Silla.
 73 AD, summer, fifth month, last day of the month. There was a solar eclipse.
 74 AD, autumn, eighth month. The generals were sent to invade Silla.
 75 AD, winter, tenth month. Baekje again attacked Wasan and sacked it.
 76 AD, autumn, ninth month. The fortress of Wasan was taken back by Silla.
 77 AD, autumn, ninth month. The king died.

Family
 Father: Onjo of Baekje
 Mother: unknown
 Brother: name unknown
 Brother: Tokusa-Ō (德佐王, ?–?) - his name in Baekje would have been Buyeo Deokjwa (扶餘德佐), recorded in the Sakyō shoban (左京諸蕃) section of the Shinsen Shōjiroku as ancestor of several clans making him one of the earliest people from Baekje to settle in Japan.
 Queen(s): unknown
 Son: 3rd King, Giru of Baekje (己婁王, ?–128) - eldest son, before he became king he was known as Buyeo Giru (扶餘己婁).

See also
List of monarchs of Korea
History of Korea

References

  Content in this article was copied from Samguk Sagi Scroll 23 at the Shoki Wiki, which is licensed under the Creative Commons Attribution-Share Alike 3.0 (Unported) (CC-BY-SA 3.0) license.

The Academy of Korean Studies
Korea Britannica

77 deaths
Baekje rulers
1st-century monarchs in Asia
Year of birth unknown
1st-century Korean people